Zebre Parma (meaning "Zebras") are an Italian professional rugby union team competing in the United Rugby Championship and EPCR competitions from the 2012–13 season. They are based in Parma (Emilia-Romagna), Italy. They are operated by the Italian Rugby Federation (FIR) and replaced Aironi in the Pro12.

Zebre Parma, often referred to as "the XV of the North-West", represents the four committees of Emilia-Romagna, Liguria, Lombardy and Piedmont, which includes tens of thousands of members and several clubs. Since 2018, it represents also teams from others committees like Abruzzo, Lazio, Marche, Tuscany and Sicily. The team was officially named Zebre Parma at the start of the 2021–22 United Rugby Championship season.

History

The entry of Italian teams into the Celtic League had been proposed for many years. After several failed attempts, there was hope that a deal for Italian entry would be done in time for the 2010–11 season, with the Scots delaying support for entry until changes were made to the Celtic League management structure. In February 2010, it was announced that the planned expansion of the Celtic League was to be put on hold. The reasons were the insistence by existing members that the Italian teams could be ejected after three years. Also, the financial demands that the league placed on the Italians could not be met. The existing teams said this was to cover the need to have larger squads to cover the extra fixtures and additional travel expenses. Agreement was reached in early March 2010 to allow Italian teams entry to the Celtic League in time for the 2010–11 season. The clubs will also be guaranteed places in the annual Heineken Cup, which had previously been awarded to the two top teams in the National Championship of Excellence.

Italy have failed to make an impact in the Six Nations Championship since joining in 2000. This has largely been blamed on the fact their best players do not have a competitive enough domestic tournament or are forced to play abroad. The fact that the Six Nations decider in 2009 between Wales and Ireland featured 42 Celtic League players out of 44 in their squads supported this notion.

After initial applications in 2010, it was proposed that Aironi would join along with a new team, Praetorians Roma, but Benetton Treviso were nominated instead. Benetton Treviso and Duchi Nord-Ovest could not agree to form one club to represent the Veneto region and lost out in the first round of bidding despite the region being the traditional home of Italian rugby. However, Pretorians Roma failed to satisfy the evaluators of their financial muscle and Benetton Treviso were nominated in their place.

Aironi struggled in their first season; a surprise European Cup win over Biarritz was the only highlight of a campaign in which they managed only one Pro12 victory. At the end of a second season of struggle on the pitch, Aironi succumbed to financial difficulties off it. Their licence to play both in the European Cup and Pro12 was revoked by the Italian Rugby Federation. The Federation decided against another domestic Italian club taking over the running of the licence, instead opting to maintain complete control of a planned new franchise. In June 2012, it was announced that the new franchise would be known as Zebre and based in Parma.

Zebre did not enjoy much success in their first season, 2012–13, finishing bottom after winless campaigns in both the Pro12 and the Heineken Cup. Although they finished the subsequent 2013–14 season bottom once again, their performance was much improved, seeing their first victory against Cardiff Blues at the Arms Park into Round 3 of Pro12, in a season in which they had five league victories, with their away win in Cardiff followed by home victories against the Ospreys, Edinburgh, Cardiff Blues and Italian Rivals Treviso, who finished the season a single point ahead of Zebre. They fared somewhat worse in 2014–15, managing only 3 victories and finishing bottom of the table for the third season running. In the 2015–16 seasons they again earned five victories including back to back victories against Treviso and a bonus-point victory against the Newport Gwent Dragons. Zebre avoided finishing in last place for the first time.

Honours
Italian Celtic League/Pro12/Pro14 derbies:
Winners: 1 (2015–16)

Current standings

The team

Name history

Founded in 1973 by the former Italian national captain Marco Bollesan, Zebre (English: Zebras) was chosen, in 2012, by the Italian Rugby Federation as the new franchise's name. The name had been used by an invitational select rugby union team based in Northwest Italy that played regular fixtures between 1973 and 1997. In those 23 years, 25 matches were held against international clubs; and resulted in a high number of victories for Zebre. The opening match was an unofficial test played in Milan in 1973 against the Australian team of Randwick Sydney, who won 21–50. Zebre had a memorable 48–38 victory against the Barbarians in Brescia in June 1997.

Two other former select teams are Dogi (The Doges) based in Triveneto and I Lupi (The Wolves) based in Central and Southern Italy.

Stadium and training

The team play in Parma at the Stadio Sergio Lanfranchi, the former home ground of Crociati Parma and the F.I.R. Academy. Initially, the ground is being refurbished and expanded. Zebre usually hold their summer training camp at Parma University. In its history, Zebre played also official matches in others different homegrounds: 
– In the 2012–13 Pro12 season at Reggio Emilia's Stadio Città del Tricolore, against Leinster; 
– In the 2017–18 Pro14 season at Stadio Tommaso Fattori of L'Aquila, Abruzzo,  against Dragons; 
– In the 2018–19 Pro14 season at Stadio Luigi Zaffanella of Viadana, Lombardy,  against Leinster 
– In the 2019–20 European Rugby Challenge Cup season at Stadio San Michele of Calvisano, Lombardy,  against Brive 
– In the 2019–20 Pro14 season at Stadio Giovanni Mari of Legnano, Lombardy,  against Munster;

Staff and coaching team
The staff for the 2022–23 season is:

Head coach – Fabio Roselli
Assistant coaches – Aldo Birchall, Emiliano Bergamaschi, David Williams
Technical director – Franco Tonni
Team Manager – Tommaso Bricoli, Gianmarco Garavaldi
Fitness coach – Francesco Della Ceca, Sebastiano Peri, Pietro Scirocchi
Video analyst – Niccolò Gaetaniello, Flavio Ferrares, Sara Squassabia
Rugby Operations Manager - George Biagi

Players

Zebre is mostly based on Italian players, rather than foreigners. In 2012, of the initial list of 36 contracted players, only three were ineligible to play for Italy. Nineteen former Aironi players were included in the original squad. An emphasis on youth development was also visible, with a significant portion of the squad being made up of members of  F.I.R. Academy Ivan Francescato .

Current squad

Additional player squad

Selected former players
Former players who have played for Zebre and have caps for their respective country

  Eduardo Bello
  Bruno Postiglioni
  Guillermo Roan
  Luke Burgess
  Kameli Ratuvou
  Asaeli Tuivuaka
  Matías Agüero
  Andrea Bacchetti
  Mattia Bellini
  Alberto Benettin
  Mauro Bergamasco
  Mirco Bergamasco
  Valerio Bernabò
  George Biagi
  Giulio Bisegni
  Marco Bortolami
  Paolo Buso
  Carlo Canna
  Tommaso Castello
  Pietro Ceccarelli
  Alberto Chillon
  Dario Chistolini
  Tommaso D'Apice
  Paul Derbyshire
  Andrea De Marchi
  Carlo Festuccia
  Danilo Fischetti
  Joshua Furno
  Quintin Geldenhuys
  Gonzalo Garcia
  Renato Giammarioli
  Davide Giazzon
  Kelly Haimona
  Tommaso Iannone
  Andrea Lovotti 
  Andrea Manici 
  Maxime Mbanda
  Matteo Minozzi
  Federico Mori
  Luciano Orquera
  Roberto Quartaroli
  Samuele Pace
  Edoardo Padovani
  Guglielmo Palazzani
  Sami Panico
  Salvatore Perugini
  Matteo Pratichetti
  Lorenzo Romano
  Federico Ruzza
  Jacopo Sarto
  Leonardo Sarto
  Fabio Semenzato
  Josh Sole
  Cristian Stoian
  Tito Tebaldi
  Giulio Toniolatti
  Jimmy Tuivaiti
  Dries van Schalkwyk
  Giovanbattista Venditti
  Marcello Violi
  Michele Visentin
  Samuela Vunisa
  Giosuè Zilocchi
  Andrei Mahu
  Kurt Baker
  Brendon Leonard
  Mils Muliaina
  Alexandru Țăruș
  Failaga Afamasaga
  Sinoti Sinoti
  Latu Latunipulu

Season records

Pro12

Pro14

European Rugby Challenge Cup

Heineken Cup / European Rugby Champions Cup

Personnel honours and records

(correct as of 24 Dec 2022)

Bold indicates active player

See also

 Pro14
 Heineken Cup
 Aironi

References

External links

Zebre section on Official Pro12 Site 
Official Facebook Page  
Official Twitter Page 

 
Sport in Parma
Rugby clubs established in 2012
United Rugby Championship teams
2012 establishments in Italy